The Metropolitanate of Belgrade was an Eastern Orthodox ecclesiastical province (metropolitanate) which existed between 1831 and 1920, with jurisdiction over the territory of Principality and Kingdom of Serbia. It was formed in 1831, when the Ecumenical Patriarchate of Constantinople granted church autonomy to its eparchies in the Principality of Serbia. Territorial enlargement and full canonical autocephaly were gained in 1879. The Metropolitanate of Belgrade existed until 1920, when it was merged with Patriarchate of Karlovci and other Serbian ecclesiastical provinces to form the united Serbian Orthodox Church. The seat of the Metropolitanate was in Belgrade, Serbia.

The Metropolitanate and all of its eparchies suffered significant loses during World War I (1914–1918), particularly after 1915, during the occupation of Serbia by the Central Powers.

Eparchies

It included following eparchies:

Metropolitans, 1831–1920

See also
 Archbishopric of Belgrade and Karlovci
 Serbian Orthodox Church
 List of heads of the Serbian Orthodox Church
 Religion in Serbia

References

Sources

 
 
 
 
 
 
 
 
 
 

Defunct religious sees of the Serbian Orthodox Church
History of the Serbian Orthodox Church
Christianity in Serbia
Christianity in Yugoslavia
1831 establishments in Serbia
1920 disestablishments in Yugoslavia
Religious organizations established in 1831
Religious organizations disestablished in 1920
Principality of Serbia
Kingdom of Serbia
Kingdom of Yugoslavia
19th century in Belgrade
20th century in Belgrade